Daphnis and Chloe (Daphnis kai Chloē) is an ancient Greek novel written in the Roman Empire, the only known work of the second-century AD Greek novelist and romance writer Longus.

Setting and style
It is set on the Greek isle of Lesbos, where scholars assume the author to have lived. Its style is rhetorical and pastoral; its shepherds and shepherdesses are wholly conventional, but the author imparts human interest to this idealized world. Daphnis and Chloe resembles a modern novel more than does its chief rival among Greek erotic romances, the Aethiopica of Heliodorus, which is remarkable more for its plot than for its characterization.

Plot summary

Daphnis and Chloe is the story of a boy (Daphnis) and a girl (Chloe), each of whom is abandoned at birth along with some identifying tokens. A goatherd named Lamon discovers Daphnis, and a shepherd called Dryas finds Chloe. Each decides to raise the child he finds as his own. Daphnis and Chloe grow up together, herding the flocks for their foster parents. They fall in love but, being naive, do not understand what is happening to them. Philetas, a wise old cowherd, explains to them what love is and tells them that the only cure is kissing. They do this. Eventually, Lycaenion, a woman from the city, educates Daphnis in love-making. Daphnis, however, decides not to test his newly acquired skill on Chloe, because Lycaenion tells Daphnis that Chloe "will scream and cry and lie bleeding heavily [as if murdered]." Throughout the book, Chloe is courted by suitors, two of whom (Dorcon and Lampis) attempt with varying degrees of success to abduct her. She is also carried off by raiders from a nearby city and saved by the intervention of the god Pan. Meanwhile, Daphnis falls into a pit, gets beaten up, is abducted by pirates, and is very nearly raped by a drunkard. In the end, after being recognised by their birth parents, Daphnis and Chloe get married and live out their bucolic lives in the country.

Characters 

The characters in the novel include:
Astylus – Dionysophanes' son
Chloe – the heroine
Daphnis – the hero
Dionysophanes – Daphnis' master and father
Dorcon – the would-be suitor of Chloe
Dryas – Chloe's foster father
Eros – god of love
Eudromus – a messenger
Gnathon – the would-be suitor of Daphnis
Lamon – Daphnis' foster father
Lampis – a cow-herder
Lycaenion – woman who educates Daphnis in love-making
Megacles – Chloe's father
Myrtale – Daphnis' foster mother
Nape – Chloe's foster mother
Pan - god of shepherds and the wild
Philetas – old countryman who advises the heroes about love; likely named after Philitas of Cos
Rhode – Chloe's mother

Text tradition
Until the beginning of the nineteenth century, about a page of text was missing; when Paul Louis Courier went to Italy, he found the missing part in one of the plutei (an ancient Roman reading desk or place for storing manuscripts) of the Biblioteca Laurenziana in Florence. However, as soon as he had copied the text, he upset the ink-stand and spilled ink all over the manuscript. The Italian philologists were incensed, especially those who had studied the pluteus giving "a most exact description" of it.

Influences and adaptations

The first vernacular edition of Daphnis and Chloe was the French version of Jacques Amyot, published in 1559. Along with the Diana of Jorge de Montemayor (published in the same year), Daphnis and Chloe helped inaugurate a European vogue for pastoral fiction in the sixteenth and seventeenth centuries. Daphnis and Chloe was the model of La Sireine of Honoré d'Urfé, the Aminta of Torquato Tasso, and The Gentle Shepherd of Allan Ramsay. The novel Paul et Virginie by Jacques-Henri Bernardin de Saint-Pierre echoes the same story.

Jacques Amyot's French translation is perhaps better known than the original. The story has been presented in numerous illustrated editions, including a 1937 limited edition with woodcuts by Aristide Maillol, and a 1977 edition illustrated by Marc Chagall. Another translation that rivals the original is that of Annibale Caro, one of those writers dearest to lovers of the Tuscan elegances.

The 1952 work Shiosai (The Sound of Waves), written by the Japanese writer Yukio Mishima following a visit to Greece, is considered to have been inspired by the Daphnis and Chloe myth. Another work based on it is the 1923 novel Le Blé en herbe by Colette.

The 1987 film The Princess Bride contains similarities to Daphnis and Chloe (for example, in both stories the male romantic lead is captured by pirates). Lawrence Rinder, director of the Berkeley Art Museum and Pacific Film Archive, attributes the inspiration for the film to Longus.

Opera

 Jacques Offenbach wrote a one-act operetta based on the story in 1860.
 Joseph Bodin de Boismortier wrote a Daphnis et Chloé pastorale in 3 acts in 1747.
Jean-Jacques Rousseau wrote a pastorale heroïque called Daphnis et Chloè between 1774 and 1776. The work was never finished, due to his death in 1778.

Ballet

 Maurice Ravel wrote the 1912 ballet Daphnis et Chloé for Sergei Diaghilev's Ballets Russes, choreographed by Michel Fokine.
 The music by Ravel was also used in the ballet of the same name by Frederick Ashton, first performed by the Sadler's Wells Ballet (now The Royal Ballet) at Covent Garden on 5 April 1951, with Margot Fonteyn as Chloe and Michael Somes as Daphnis. Decor was by John Craxton.
 John Neumeier choreographed the ballet Daphnis and Chloe for his Frankfurt Ballet company.
 Jean-Christophe Maillot created a contemporary and sensual choreography of the ballet Daphnis et Chloé for Les Ballets de Monte-Carlo. This shorter 35 minute choreography also uses Maurice Ravel's music, but not the whole original ballet. It features Jeroen Verbruggen as Daphnis, Anjara Ballesteros-Cilla as Chloe, Bernice Coppieters as Lycenion and Chris Roelandt as Dorcon, and was directed by Denis Caïozzi and produced by Telmondis, Les Ballets de Monte-Carlo and Mezzo. The ballet premiered on April 1, 2010, at the Grimaldi Forum in Monaco and has since then been broadcast several times on television internationally.

Art 

 Marc Chagall produced a series of 42 color lithographs based on the tale of Daphnis and Chloe.

Cinema
 The work was adapted into a 64-minute silent film by Orestis Laskos in 1931, one of the first Greek cinema classics. The movie was originally considered shocking due to the nudity in some of the scenes.
 The story was the basis for the 1963 film Μικρές Αφροδίτες (Mikres Afrodites), or Young Aphrodites, by the Greek filmmaker Nikos Koundouros, based on a script of Vassilis Vassilikos.

Radio
The work was adapted into a 45-minute radio play in 2006 by Hattie Naylor.

Editions
 The first printed edition.
Courier, Paul Louis (1810). Contained a previously unknown passage, after the discovery of a new manuscript.
 With English translation.
 With English translation revised from that of George Thornley.
 With French translation.
 With French translation.
 Reeve's text is reprinted with the translation and commentary by Morgan (see below).

English translations
 A revised version is printed with Edmonds's text (see above).

 With reprint of Reeve's text and a commentary.

 Side-by-side Greek text and English translation.
Humphreys, Nigel (2015). The Love Song of Daphnis and Chloe, Circaidy Gregory Press. . In the format of an Epic Poem.

See also

Other ancient Greek novelists:
 Chariton: The Loves of Chaereas and Callirhoe
 Xenophon of Ephesus: The Ephesian Tale
 Achilles Tatius: Leucippe and Clitophon
 Heliodorus of Emesa: The Aethiopica

Footnotes

External links

Editions of the Greek text
Longi Pastoralium de Daphnide et Chloe Libri IV Graece et Latine Ed. Christ. Guil. Mitscherlich, Biponti (Zweibrücken), 1794.
Longi Pastoralia First complete Greek text of Daphnis and Chloe, edited by P.-L. Courier, with a Latin translation by G. R. Lud. de Sinner. Paris, 1829.
Longi Pastoralia Greek text of Daphnis and Chloe with a Latin translation, edd. Seiler, Schaefer, Boissonade & Brunck. Leipzig, 1843.
Erotici Scriptores Paris, 1856. Longi Pastoralia, Greek text with Latin translation, edited by G A Hirschig, pp. 174–222.
Daphnis and Chloe The Bibliotheca Classica Selecta's 2006/07 edition of the Greek text with the French translation of Jacques Amyot revised, corrected and completed by P.-L. Courier.

Synopses, analyses, and other studies
Chirping Cicadas and Singing Crickets An article – written from the standpoint of a cultural entomologist – by Herbert Weidner, Hamburg, Germany.
Daphnis and Chloe: Its influence on art and its impact on Goethe An entry in the Encyclopedia of World Biography which also notes the work done by William E. McCulloh, Emeritus Professor of Classics at Kenyon College, Ohio, in dating Daphnis and Chloe.
Longus: Life, Influence & Bibliography An entry in the Encyclopedia of the Ancient World.
J. C. Dunlop's History of Fiction London, 1888, vol. 1, pp. 45–57.

Audiobooks

Ancient Greek novels
2nd-century novels
Greek novels adapted into films
Fictional couples
Love stories